Grande Premio Princesa do Sul is a traditional non-graded stake race, left-handed flat race for three-year-olds and up (3yo+) thoroughbreds in Brazil. It is a traditional horse race in dirt track in Brazil, raced since 1936. Disputed over (actually) 2,200 meters, at Hipodromo da Tablada, Pelotas. Race Day is March, Sunday, every year.

Winners
YEAR - WINNER - (SIRE & DAM) - DISTANCE - 2nd PLACE, 3rd PLACE - TIME (in seconds)

2450mt :

2100mt : 

3000mt : 

2300mt :

2100mt : 

2200mt

References

External links

 G. P. Princesa do Sul   
 Former issues 
 G. P. Princesa do Sul TV documentary 2011   
 Thoroughbred Database. Results for G. P. Princesa do Sul

Horse races in Brazil